Marco Sansovini (born 17 June 1980) is an Italian professional footballer who last played as striker for Italian Serie D club San Nicolò Notaresco.

Sansovini was nicknamed "Il Sindaco".

Career

Early career
Born in Rome, capital of Italy, Sansovini started his professional career at A.S. Roma. He was loaned to Serie C1 club Foggia in 1998–99 season. In mid-2000 he left for Serie C2 club Viareggio in a co-ownership deal for a peppercorn fee of 1 million Italian lire (about €516) along with Andrea Giallombardo. He only scored twice in 2000–01 Serie C2. In June 2001 Roma gave up the remain 50% registration rights of both Giallombardo and Sansovini. In 2001–02 Serie C2, Sansovini found a way to score with 8 goals. In 2002–03 he changed to play for Serie C1 club Sassari Torres. However, he only scored once in the first half of the season. In January 2003 he was loaned to fourth-tier team Tivoli. Sansovini only played 9 times, but with an impressive 4 goals, nearly 0.44 goals per game. Sansovini returned to Sardegna in 2003–04 Serie C1. However, he only played 615 minutes in the whole season with 2 goals.

Sansovini transferred to Pro Sesto of Italian fourth-tier in mid-2004. He netted 7 goals for the 2004–05 Serie C2 Group A champion. He also scored even more goals in 2005–06 Serie C1 (11 goals). Sansovini previously only had 3 Serie C1 goals in his accounts, with Torres. However Pro Sesto also had a second least goal scoring record and none of a players scored in the relegation "play-out". His striking partners, all failed to score. (Marcos de Paula, 4 goals in half season; Leandro Lázzaro, twice; Claudio Salvi, once) However Pro Sesto re-admitted to Italian third-tier as numbers of club was expelled from that division due to different reasons. Despite remaining in Serie C1, Sansovini was sold to fellow third-tier club Grosseto.

Grosseto
Sansovini was signed by Grosseto in mid-2006. He had a mix seasons with the Tuscany club. Sansovini did not have a place in 2006–07 Serie C1. He also failed to score in the first half of the season until he left for Manfredonia.

In late August 2007 he left for Pescara. The team was newly relegated from Serie B while Grosseto promoted to 2007–08 Serie B as third division group A winner. Once again Sansovini won a place in starting eleven and converted the chance to 16 goals. However Franco Lerda did not trust any one of the rest of the strikers, while he used forwards such as Luis Maria Alfageme (half-season), Nico De Lucia (half-season) and Nicola Falomi (half-season) as the partner of Sansovini in the formation. Despite the rotation of the squad, Pescara collected the most goals among the group and missed the promotion both by aggregate result against Perugia and 1 point penalty.

Sansovini's ability made Grosseto offering second chance to him. In his maiden second division, Sansovini scored 15 goals, a goal shy than last season (16 goals). His goal scoring partner Thomas Pichlmann also scored a considerable goals (12 goals) but not for Alessandro Pellicori, Ferdinando Sforzini (half-season) and Marco Carparelli (half-season). Grosseto entered the promotion play-off, losing to Livorno 4–3 in the first round/semi-finals. Eventually Livorno was the winner. Sansovini played both match with only one goal, while his partner Pichlmann (first match) and Pellicori (second match) failed to score. In 2009–10 Serie B, Sansovini was the starting forward along with Pichlmann. He failed to score and he was surprisingly sold to third division club Pescara on the last day of summer transfer window. On the same day Grosseto signed Joelson as replacement and Alfageme few days earlier, in temporary deal and co-ownership deal for peppercorn respectively.

Return to Pescara
On 31 August 2009, he returned to Pescara in a definitive deal, in a four-year contract for €600,000 transfer fee, rejoining former Grosseto coach Antonello Cuccureddu. Despite Sansovini was one of the starting forward with 26 starts, Sansovini only scored 4 times, only 1 more than his backup Francesco Zizzari and Mario Artistico (half-season). Another new signing Massimo Ganci scored 8 goals with lesser start and Samuele Olivi scored 4 goals as a defender. Both Sansovini and Ganci scored in the promotion playoffs of the third division and Pescara promoted.

Sansovini again found his shoes in 2010–11 Serie B with 11 goals. However Ganci and new signing Cristian Bucchi and Stefano Giacomelli all failed to score. Instead, winger Massimo Bonanni was the second goalscorer of the team with 5 goals only. Pescara finished in the mid-table (13th /22teams) with 16th goal scored and 9th least goal conceded.

Sansovini remained in the starting XI in 2011–12 Serie B. That season Zdeněk Zeman used 4–3–3 formation. That season, Sansovini played 41 rounds with 16 goals. Pescara also signed Juventus wonder-kid Ciro Immobile and Napoli rising star Lorenzo Insigne. The team had the most powerful goal scoring ability with 90 goals; Immobile was the league topscored with 28 goals, while Insigne had 18 goals and Sansovini was the third of the team.

Spezia
Despite failed to keep Immobile and Insigne whom both joined Pescara in temporary deals, as well as coach Zeman, Sansovini also left the club on 21 June 2012 to Serie B newcomer Spezia for €150,000 fee in a two-year contract. On 25 July 2013, Sansovini added one more year to the contract. On 10 January 2014, he was signed by Novara in temporary deal.

Virtus Entella
On 19 July 2014, he was signed by Virtus Entella.

Second return to Pescara
On 2 February 2015, Sansovini returned to Pescara in a temporary deal; Aniello Cutolo moved to opposite direction on the same day. On 27 June Pescara signed him outright.

On 27 January 2016, Sansovini was signed by Lega Pro club Cremonese in a temporary deal.

Teramo
On 20 July 2016, Sansovini left for Teramo in a two-year loan.

Serie D
On 5 August 2019, he joined Serie D club San Nicolò Notaresco.

Honours
Pro Sesto
 Lega Pro Seconda Divisione: 2004–05

Grosseto
 Lega Pro Prima Divisione: 2006–07

Pescara
 Serie B: 2011–12

References

External links
 Football.it Profile  
 

1980 births
Living people
Italian footballers
Serie B players
Serie C players
Serie D players
A.S. Roma players
Calcio Foggia 1920 players
F.C. Esperia Viareggio players
S.S.D. Pro Sesto players
F.C. Grosseto S.S.D. players
Manfredonia Calcio players
Delfino Pescara 1936 players
Spezia Calcio players
Novara F.C. players
Virtus Entella players
S.E.F. Torres 1903 players
Modena F.C. players
Association football forwards
Footballers from Rome